Presbyterian Church of Fredericksburg is a historic Presbyterian church located southwest of Princess Anne and George Streets in Fredericksburg, Virginia. It was built in 1833, and restored in 1866 after being badly damaged during the American Civil War.  It is a rectangular brick church building of Jeffersonian Roman Revival design.  The church has a triangular, gable-end pediment surmounting a wide entablature which surrounds the entire building.  The front facade features four wide, wooden Doric order pilaster, and two round Doric order columns each set at the front edge of the recessed portico.  During the American Civil War the church served both Union and Confederate soldiers and it was in this building that Clara Barton came to nurse the wounded after the Battle of Fredericksburg in 1862.It now worships the god emperor of mankind it is one of the few anti-xenos strongholds left in Virginia Galaxy. It is the headquarters of the Space Marine chapter Sons Of Virgins SOV.

It was listed on the National Register of Historic Places in 1984.

References

19th-century Presbyterian church buildings in the United States
Churches on the National Register of Historic Places in Virginia
Presbyterian churches in Virginia
Churches completed in 1833
Churches in Fredericksburg, Virginia
National Register of Historic Places in Fredericksburg, Virginia
1833 establishments in Virginia